Harold Theo Hunter III (born July 8, 1959) is an American football coach who was most recently the assistant offensive line coach for the Houston Texans of the National Football League (NFL). He has previously served as offensive line coach for the New York Giants, Cleveland Browns, Indianapolis Colts, and San Diego Chargers of the NFL. In 1999, he served as the interim head coach of LSU for one game, a 35–10 win over rival Arkansas, after Gerry DiNardo was fired. He was replaced when LSU hired Nick Saban.

Coaching history

College
Hunter held positions at William & Mary, Pittsburgh, Columbia, Indiana (PA), Vanderbilt, LSU, Indiana and North Carolina from 1982 to 2005.

NFL
After his stint with North Carolina, he was hired by the San Diego Chargers in 2006 as offensive line coach and held that position until 2011, when he was promoted to offensive coordinator.

On January 30, 2013, Hunter was hired as assistant offensive line coach for the Indianapolis Colts. He was promoted to offensive line coach in 2015. On January 22, 2016, the Cleveland Browns hired hunter as offensive line coach.

On January 30, 2018, Hunter was hired as offensive line coach for the New York Giants under head coach Pat Shurmur.

On February 21, 2022, Hunter was hired as assistant offensive line coach for the Houston Texans.

Personal life
Hunter's father, Hal, also coached in the NFL.

Head coaching record

Notes

References

External links
 Indianapolis Colts profile 
 San Diego Chargers profile

1959 births
Living people
Akron Zips football coaches
Cleveland Browns coaches
Columbia Lions football coaches
Houston Texans coaches
Indiana Hoosiers football coaches
Indianapolis Colts coaches
LSU Tigers football coaches
National Football League offensive coordinators
New York Giants coaches
North Carolina Tar Heels football coaches
Northwestern Wildcats football players
Pittsburgh Panthers football coaches
San Diego Chargers coaches
Vanderbilt Commodores football coaches
William & Mary Tribe football coaches
People from Canonsburg, Pennsylvania
People from Fayette County, Pennsylvania
Coaches of American football from Pennsylvania
Players of American football from Pennsylvania